Green faces, Burnt bodies is a film by Mahmoud Shoolizadeh about life and death of trees during wars. 
In the film, cutting trees and their branches, perforating the trunk and eradicating the trees are shown dramatically during the war invasion against Iran. In the war, the trees and nature would be damaged too, and the death and life process would be enhanced in all dimensions. In the end, the green leaves of the plant shoot out and once again the trees blossom and life begins.

This film participated in:
Youth Short Film Festival in Iran and became candidate for the best documentary, 1985, 
Holy Defence Film Festival in Tehran, Iran, 1986

Technical specifications and Film crew 

Green faces, Burnt bodies

16mm, 17min,  Documentary, Iran, 1985 
Director: Mahmoud Shoolizadeh
Script writer: Aliakbar Booghalami, 
Photograph: Morteza Hajmoradi, 
Edit: Esfandyar Habib nejad, 
Producer: Mahmoud Shoolizadeh (University of TV & Radio, Iran)

Iranian drama films
Iranian short films